Kralkızı Dam is one of the 21 dams of the Southeastern Anatolia Project of Turkey in Batman. The hydroelectric power plant has a total installed power capacity of 94 MW. The dam was constructed between 1985 and 1997.

These facilities are located on the Maden Stream, one of the important tributaries of the Tigris River, at a distance of 81 kilometres to Diyarbakır and 6 kilometres to the township of Dicle.

Notes

References
 
 www.un.org.tr/undp/Gap.htm - United Nations  Southeast Anatolia Sustainable Human Development Program (GAP)
 www.gapturkiye.gen.tr/english/current.html Current status of GAP as of June 2000
www.ecgd.gov.uk Data sheet

External links
 www.gap.gov.tr - Official GAP web site

Dams in Diyarbakır Province
Southeastern Anatolia Project
Dams completed in 1997
Rock-filled dams
Dams in the Tigris River basin